Carlos Areces (born 27 March 1976) is a Spanish actor, singer, and comics artist. He has performed in a number of television shows and in more than twenty films since 2002. He formed the musical duo Ojete Calor together with Aníbal Gómez.

Selected filmography

References

External links

 

1976 births
Living people
Spanish male film actors
Spanish comics artists
Male actors from Madrid
21st-century Spanish male artists
21st-century Spanish male actors